Brian Leslie Kelly (22 May 1943 – 2 August 2018) was an English professional footballer who played as a full back in the Football League for Bradford City, Doncaster Rovers and York City. He later played for Halifax Town and Bartle Rovers.

He was born in Ilkley in 1943. He died on 2 August 2018, aged 75.

References

1943 births
2018 deaths
People from Ilkley
English footballers
Bradford City A.F.C. players
Doncaster Rovers F.C. players
York City F.C. players
Halifax Town A.F.C. players
English Football League players
Association football fullbacks